The Großer Nickus is a hill in Hesse, Germany.

Hills of Hesse
Mountains and hills of the Rhön